Monakhovo is a rural locality (a settlement) in Barguzinsky District, Republic of Buryatia, Russia. The population was 4 as of 2010.

Geography 
Monakhovo is located 87 km west of Barguzin (the district's administrative centre) by road. Katun is the nearest rural locality.

References 

Rural localities in Barguzinsky District
Populated places on Lake Baikal